Colorful Guizhou Airlines is a low-cost Chinese regional airline with its headquarters in Guiyang, Guizhou, and with its fleet based at Guiyang Longdongbao International Airport. It is intended to improve air service in Western China, particularly Guizhou Province. It is the first locally-owned airline in the province. The airline commenced flights in December 2015, operating Embraer 190s to destinations throughout the country.

History 
On 18 May 2015, the Civil Aviation Administration of China (CAAC) granted Guizhou Industrial Investment (Group) Co., Ltd. and Weining County Construction Investment Group preliminary approval to jointly establish Duocai Guizhou Airlines. The airline was officially established as Colorful Guizhou Airlines on 19 June 2015.

The name "Colorful Guizhou" comes from a marketing campaign by the provincial government; it signifies the cultural diversity within Guizhou Province.

On 15 June 2015, the airline placed an order for 17 Embraer 190 aircraft, 7 of which were firm orders and the other 10 options. If all options are exercised, the transaction will be valued at US$834 million. Colorful Guizhou Airlines hopes to expand its fleet to 30 aircraft by 2020 and 120–140 aircraft in the future.

On 5 December 2015, the airline received its first Embraer 190, followed by a second aircraft on 18 December. It filed an application for an air operator's certificate from the CAAC on 15 December.

On 31 December 2015, Colorful Guizhou Airlines commenced operations with a flight from its hub Guiyang to Bijie. It plans to add flights to Chengdu and Tongren.

On 24 October 2019, Colorful Guizhou Airlines received its first Airbus Airbus A320neo which by March of 2020 overall would become a firm 2 Airbus A320neo's in its official fleet.

Corporate affairs 
Colorful Guizhou Airlines is a joint venture between Guizhou Industrial Investment (Group) Co., Ltd. (95%), and Weining County Construction Investment Group (5%). The groups invested a total of RMB 1 billion in the airline.

The chairman of the airline is Zhai Yan, who is also chairman of Guizhou Industrial Investment Group.

Destinations 

 
Colorful Guizhou Airlines flies to the following destinations in China as of August 2017:

Fleet
, the Colorful Guizhou Airlines fleet consists of the following aircraft:

References

External links
 

Airlines established in 2015
Transport in Guizhou
Companies based in Guizhou
Chinese companies established in 2015
Low-cost carriers